Mohammedan Sporting Club (MSC) is a major sporting club in Bangladesh. It is mainly located in Jhenaidah, Bangladesh, though there are many local branches throughout the country.

See also

 Kolkata Mohammedan
 Dhaka Mohammedan
 Chittagong Mohammedan

References

Football clubs in Bangladesh